Magnet is a British kitchen retailer operating in over two hundred locations across the United Kingdom supplying products under the Magnet and Magnet Trade brands. The company has over 2,000 employees and its headquarters are in Darlington, County Durham.

Magnet was listed on the London Stock Exchange, and was once a constituent of the FTSE 100 Index, but is now part of Nobia UK, a division of the Nobia group which is listed on the Swedish Stock Exchange. The Nobia division also includes brands such as Gower and Norema.

History

Formation and early years 
Magnet was established in Bingley, West Yorkshire in 1918 by Tom Duxbury. Legend has it that Duxbury traded his horse for a firelighting company and named his new company Magnet after the horse.  During the 1920s Magnet pioneered the mass production of joinery, door and window products and soon began supplying joinery components for major construction projects. New operations were opened in Keighley, Grays and Knaresborough to satisfy demand for the growing business.

1960s
In 1960, the company opened its first branch in Bingley. This concept of the company having their own outlets quickly develops in other towns in the United Kingdom.

1970s
Kitchen products were introduced in 1970, and soon after, a new factory in Darlington was established to manufacture joinery and kitchen furniture. In 1975, Magnet became Britain's largest manufacturer of joinery products with 115 branches. In 1975, Magnet merges with timber group Southern-Evans to form Magnet & Southerns. The combined business, following the merger, exceeded two hundred branches.

1980s

In 1984, Magnet & Southerns became a founder member of the FTSE-100 share index. The company continued to expand during the 1980s, with new manufacturing sites in Rotherham, Thornton, Penrith, Burnley and Deeside opened together with the acquisition of the Thomas Easthams kitchen business.

Seeing the growth of the burgeoning DIY sector, the company decided to move into the retail kitchen market, and opened its first retail kitchen showrooms in 1985. In March 1989, Magnet sold the Southern-Evans timber business in preparation for a £629m management buy out which took place the following year.

Soon after, difficulties in the economy in the United Kingdom led to a severe downturn in the housing market and a significant downturn in sales. Magnet, unable to pay its bankers, fought to remain cash positive to survive. In 1989, Tom Duxbury led a management buyout of the business. The buyout failed quite quickly and the banks took control of the business.

1990s

In 1990, separate Retail and Trade divisions were established to maximise customer service for these very different market sectors. Factories in Easthams, Thornton, Burnley, Deeside, Gillingham and Lincoln were closed, with work transferred to Darlington and Keighley. In March 1994, Berisford acquired the company and planned to re establish Magnet as the Number One Kitchen and Joinery company in the United Kingdom.

The company's financial performance stabilised, but a lack of investment and a long running industrial dispute meant that the company did not see any significant growth.

2000s
In April 2001, Magnet was acquired by Nobia, a Swedish-based kitchen company for £134m. Significant investments were made in the company, with a multimillion-pound showroom refurbishment programme and the introduction of the Trade Concept, an initiative to grow the company's market share in the trade channel. To support the increased demand for Magnet products, further investment was made in the Darlington site converting the manufacturing operation into a modern assemble to order facility.

Operations

Magnet

Magnet supplies kitchens to retail consumers via 170 showrooms. The company primarily targets the middle market, and offers kitchen designs together with a range of worktops, sinks and taps, electrical appliances and kitchen accessories.

In 2003, Magnet's retail showroom concept won Best UK Retail Interior by Retail Interiors Magazine, and has subsequently refurbished the majority of its estate in line with this footprint. Magnet was the first national kitchen retailer to achieve Trustmark accreditation, a scheme designed to drive out the cowboys in the home improvement sector.

Magnet Trade

Magnet Trade sells only to registered trade customers through its network of 159 branches. The majority of customers are local tradesmen such as joiners, builders and kitchen fitters. Magnet Trade also supplies organisations in the RSL sector such as Local Authorities and Housing associations.

Alongside a kitchen offering (cabinets, appliances, worktops, sinks & taps), the company supplies joinery (Doors, Windows, Timber, Wood flooring, Hardware). Products are supplied from stock held on site in the branch warehouse. Free kitchen planning, made to measure timber window ordering and local delivery services are also offered.

Magnet Trade has a separate in store environment and brand identity, to clearly differentiate it from the retail business.

Mixed sites 

The majority of Magnet branches have both a trade and retail presence in the same building. There are separate entrances for each different customer group, which are clearly designated.

See also

 Nobia

References

External links
 Magnet Retail
 Magnet Trade

Kitchen manufacturers
Furniture retailers of the United Kingdom
Retail companies established in 1918
Companies based in County Durham
British brands
Manufacturing companies established in 1918
1918 establishments in England